Charles W. Missler (May 28, 1934 – May 1, 2018) was an American author, evangelical Christian, Bible teacher, engineer, and businessman.

Business career 
Missler graduated from the U.S. Naval Academy in 1956 and received a Master's degree in Engineering from UCLA.  He worked for several years in the aerospace and computer industries. He joined the Ford Motor Company in 1963. Missler joined Western Digital as chairman and chief executive in June 1977 and became the largest shareholder of Western Digital.

In 1983, Missler became the chairman and chief executive of Helionetics, Inc., another technology company. He left Helionetics in 1984 "to pursue other opportunities in the high-technology field." In August 1985, Helionetics sued Missler, alleging a conflict of interest, claiming that after Missler and other Helionetics executives had decided not to purchase a small defense electronics maker, that same company was purchased by an investment corporation in which Missler held a controlling interest. The suit was settled when Missler's firm agreed to pay Helionetics $1.6 million.

In 1989, he headed the Phoenix Group International, a former Colorado real estate company that entered the high-tech industry to sell personal computers to Russian schools. Phoenix filed for bankruptcy protection in 1990 when the deal did not develop as anticipated, due to a subsidiary being found to have no experience with computers.

Ministry
After the Phoenix deal collapsed, Missler started an online ministry, Koinonia House, and became known as a prominent Christian Zionist and speaker on the subject of Bible prophecy.

A Los Angeles Times article reported that Missler and co-author Hal Lindsey had plagiarized a portion of Miami University Professor Edwin Yamauchi's 1982 book Foes from the Northern Frontier in their own 1992 book The Magog Factor. Hal Lindsey's manager Paul Krikac said Missler had written the passages in question, but conceded that Lindsey is responsible for the overall manuscript: "His (Lindsey's) butt is on the line." After the missed attribution was acknowledged by Missler, book shipments to bookstores were discontinued and all of the authors' proceeds donated to a ministry. Missler was later accused of plagiarism of New Age writer Michael Talbot's 1992 book The Holographic Universe in his 1999 book Cosmic Codes: Messages from the Edge of Eternity. Missler also acknowledged this as missed attribution and apologized publicly. He said a correction would be inserted in all unsold copies and the book itself updated in subsequent printings. Missler donated all of the author's proceeds from the book to a ministry.

Due to his experience with technology, Missler was a figurehead in bringing the "Year Two Thousand Bug" (a.k.a. "Y2K bug") to the attention of the Christian community. In 1998, he coauthored a book with John Ankerberg investigating whether America would survive the crises to be caused, he claimed, by embedded computer chips that would malfunction on what they would calculate as year zero.

Richard Abanes wrote that through his newsletters Missler became a conduit between conservative evangelicals and anti-government, militia activists, some of whom were white supremacist.

Personal life
Missler was married to Nancy Missler. They had two sons and two daughters. Nancy died of cancer on November 11, 2015.

Death
Missler died at his home in Reporoa, New Zealand, in 2018. He is survived by his two daughters.

Books

References
Citations

Bibliography

External links

Chuck Missler's official Website

1934 births
2018 deaths
20th-century apocalypticists
20th-century evangelicals
21st-century apocalypticists
21st-century evangelicals
American Christian creationists
American Christian Zionists
American evangelists
Evangelical writers
People involved in plagiarism controversies
United States Naval Academy alumni
University of California, Los Angeles alumni
Western Digital people